PTV Sports is a Philippine sports television newscast aired on People's Television Network Channel 4 airing from Mondays to Fridays at 7:30 p.m. to 8:00 p.m.  (UTC +8).

History
It was first aired on April 17, 2006, as Teledyaryo Sports (renamed as NBN Sports from 2008 until it returned to its original name in early August 2010), and was initially hosted by Snow Badua together with Jasmin Romero and Saleema Refran as his co-hosts. It underwent changes and became the #1 sports program in the country.

On December 30, 2016, after its airing of the year-end special, it was later downgraded into a 5-minute segment of PTV News. Due to public demand and after a 10-month hiatus, the show returned to its original timeslot on October 16, 2017, and it is now aired for 30 minutes, and later underwent changes as they moved to the afternoon timeslot since August 13, 2018, due to the airing of Chinese drama serial Jimao.

Until the premiere of Sports Desk on now CNN Philippines in 2012 and later on The Score on ABS-CBN Sports & Action in 2014, PTV Sports was the only FTA television sports news program in the Philippines.

Anchors
Meg Siozon (2012–present)
Bill Velasco (2021–present)
Yra Dalao (2019–present)

Reporters and Segment Hosts
Sabel Reyes (2016–present)
Khay Asuncion (2016–present)
Paolo Salamatin (2018–present)
Maeann Fajardo (2018–present)
Rafael Bandayrel (2022–present)
Daryl Oclares (2023–present)
Audrey Gorriceta (PTV News)
Joyce Salamatin (PTV News)
Judith Caringal (Radyo Pilipinas 2)
John Mogol (Radyo Pilipinas 2)
Aaron Bayato (Radio Pilipinas 2)
Anne Vinas (Radio Pilipinas 2)
Ria Arevalo (Radio Pilipinas 2)

Former anchors and reporters
Angel Atienza-Romero (2016-2018; sister of TV host former ABS CBN Host & now current GMA 7 host Kim Atienza)
Snow Badua (2006–2015; original commissioner of MPBL)
Robert Belen (2012-2013)
Christabel de Leon (2012-2014)
Michelle Gavagan (2014)
Keisha Halili (2013-2014)
Hajji Kaamino (2015)
Myris Lee (2017-2019)
Arianne Mallare (2014-2019)
Jaypee Manosa (2011)
Yccah Montes (2012)
DJ Bobby Odulio (2013)
Ice Martinez-Pajarillo (2017-2019; formerly with News 5 & ESPN5 "now One Sports")
JP Palileo (2013)
Flor Perez (2011-2013; moved to UNTV 37; formerly a host of Radio 5 92.3 FM & also host of The Chasedown on One PH; died in 2022)
Nicole Ramos-Cando (2012-2014; now currently a singer)
Saleema Refran (2008-2010, now a GMA 7 Reporter)
Jasmin Romero (2006-2008, now an ABS-CBN Field Reporter)
Dennis Principe (2012–2021, now currently a sports commentator)
Peter Lucas (Radio Pilipinas 2; died in 2022)
Champ de Lunas (2019-2022), now an ABS-CBN News Field Reporter)
Dex Augustine (2022–2023), now an CNN Philippines Field Reporter)

Awards
Anak TV Seal Awardee (2011, 2014, 2018)

See also
 List of programs aired by People's Television Network

References

People's Television Network original programming
Philippine sports television series
2020s Philippine television series
2006 Philippine television series debuts
2016 Philippine television series endings
2017 Philippine television series debuts
Filipino-language television shows